Phillipsville may refer to:

Phillipsville, California
Phillipsville, Michigan
Phillipsville, Ontario